Made to Love Magic is a 2004 compilation album of outtakes and remixes by English singer/songwriter Nick Drake. It features a previously unreleased solo acoustic version of "River Man", dating from early 1968, and the song "Tow the Line", a previously unheard song from Drake's final session in July 1974. The compilation reached #27 on the UK Albums Chart.

Track listing
All songs are written by Nick Drake.

 "Rider on the Wheel" – 2:38
 "Magic – Orchestrated Version 2" – 2:45
 "River Man – Cambridge Version" – 4:02
 "Joey" – 3:04
 "Thoughts of Mary Jane" – 3:39
 "Mayfair – Cambridge Version" – 2:12
 "Hanging on a Star" – 3:24
 "Three Hours – Alternate Version" – 5:12
 "Clothes of Sand" – 2:31
 "Voices" – 3:45
 "Time of No Reply – Orchestrated Version" – 2:47
 "Black Eyed Dog" – 3:28
 "Tow the Line" – 2:20

Notes
Tracks 1, 4, 5, 9 & 12 are stereo remasters from Time of No Reply; track 5 is usually titled "The Thoughts of Mary Jane" on other releases.
Track 2 is "I Was Made to Love Magic" from Time of No Reply, sped-up, with a posthumously added string arrangement by Robert Kirby
Tracks 3 and 6 are Cambridge-era dorm demos (spring 1968)
Track 7 is a different take than the version originally released on Time of No Reply (February 1974)
Track 8 is a different take than the version originally released on Five Leaves Left, and features Rebop Kwaku Baah on congas (March 1969)
Track 10 is a remastered version of "Voice from the Mountain" from Time of No Reply
Track 11 has a posthumously added string arrangement by Robert Kirby
Track 13 is possibly the last song Drake ever committed to tape (July 1974)

Personnel
Nick Drake performs vocals and Steel-string guitar on all songs, except where indicated otherwise.

References

Nick Drake compilation albums
Albums produced by Joe Boyd
2004 compilation albums
Island Records compilation albums